Greenford is a London Underground and National Rail station in Greenford, Greater London, and is owned and managed by London Underground.

Greenford station is in Travelcard Zone 4.

History

The original Greenford station was opened by the Great Western Railway on 1 October 1904 on the joint "New North Main Line" (present-day Acton–Northolt line).

The present station, adjacent to the original, was designed by Brian Lewis and built in the Central line extension of the 1935-40 New Works Programme of the London Passenger Transport Board. It was completed by Frederick Francis Charles Curtis and opened on 30 June 1947 after delay due to World War II. Service at the original ("main-line") station was gradually reduced and it was closed in 1963.  Operational responsibility for the station transferred from British Rail to London Transport with effect from 13 November 1967.

The site of the old station for the New North Main Line can still be seen from inside Central line trains.

The station today
Greenford station is above ground level with an island platform for the Central line. A bay platform facing south-east between the Underground platforms serves the Greenford branch service operated by Great Western Railway.

Platform 1 is for westbound Central line trains, and platform 3 for eastbound trains. The access to the platform via escalators takes passengers to the front of the train for westbound service, and the rear for eastbound service.

Greenford was the first London Underground station to have an escalator up to platforms above street level. Until 2014 it remained the final London Underground station with a wooden-treaded escalator in service; all other such escalators were previously converted to fully metal treads, or removed altogether from sub-surface Underground stations in the wake of the fatal 1987 King's Cross fire.

In addition to the shuttle train, the line between Greenford and West Ealing carries freight services including containerised domestic waste from near Brentford, sand and gravel traffic as well as occasional special passenger services and a daily Chiltern Railways "parliamentary ghost train" from West Ruislip to West Ealing that returns non-stop to High Wycombe.

In 2009, because of financial constraints, TfL decided to stop work on a project to provide step-free access at Greenford and five other stations, on the grounds that these were relatively quiet stations and some were already one or two stops away from an existing step-free station. £3.9 million was spent on Greenford before the project was halted. The step-free access project, consisting of a glass incline lift, was later restarted, opening on 20 October 2015.

Services

London Underground
The typical off-peak service in trains per hour (tph) is:
9 tph westbound to West Ruislip
3 tph westbound to Northolt
9 tph eastbound to Epping
3 tph eastbound to Loughton

National Rail

Great Western Railway operates a shuttle service to West Ealing every 30 minutes except on Sundays. The final service of the day runs through to London Paddington, as well as the first terminating service.

Connections
London Buses routes 92, 105, 395 and E6 serve the station.

References

External links

Central line (London Underground) stations
Railway stations in the London Borough of Ealing
Tube stations in the London Borough of Ealing
Former Great Western Railway stations
Railway stations in Great Britain opened in 1904
Railway stations served by Great Western Railway